Md. Ali Azgar is a Bangladesh Awami League politician and the incumbent Member of Parliament from Chuadanga-2.

Early life
Azgar was born on 15 September 1964. He completed his undergraduate in commerce.

Career
Azgar was nominated to contest the Chudanga-2 seat by Bangladesh Awami League in 2008.

References

Awami League politicians
Living people
9th Jatiya Sangsad members
10th Jatiya Sangsad members
1964 births
11th Jatiya Sangsad members